This is a list of films released or scheduled for release in the year 2019.

Box office collection 
The highest-grossing Tollywood films released in 2019, by worldwide box office gross revenue, are as follows.

January – June

July–December

Dubbed Films

Events

Award ceremonies

Notable deaths

See also 
 List of Telugu films of 2017
 List of Telugu films of 2018

References

External links 

2019
Telugu
Telugu